Satellite Award for Best Actor may refer to:

Satellite Award for Best Actor – Motion Picture,
Satellite Award for Best Actor – Television Series Drama,
Satellite Award for Best Actor – Television Series Musical or Comedy, or
Satellite Award for Best Actor – Miniseries or Television Film

Actor